Sanlúcar de Guadiana is a localidad in the province of Huelva, Andalusia, Spain, situated near the Portugal–Spain border,  from the city of Huelva. The inhabitants are known as Sanluqueños.

The restored San Marcos castle overlooks the village.

The village faces Alcoutim across the river.

References

External links
 Ayuntamiento (Town Authority)

Municipalities in the Province of Huelva